The Mystery of the Pantomime Cat, published 1949, is the seventh novel in the ''Five Find-Outers'Or mystery' series written by Enid Blyton.

Plot
A theatre  safe is rifled - and the main suspect is the Pantomime Cat. Or is it his friend Zoe? The five find-outers and dog are on the track - with the help of PC Pippin, who is standing in for Mr Goon. Despite all the false clues the find-outers have planted to throw the police off the scent, they finally discover the perpetrator.

Characters
Fatty - The chief of the Five Find-Outers and Dog
Larry - The former chief of the Five Find-Outers and Dog
Pip - A member of the Five Find-Outers and Dog
Bets - The youngest member of the Five Find-Outers and Dog
Daisy - A member of the Five Find-Outers and Dog
Buster - A black scottie dog owned by Fatty, who is a member of the Five Find-Outers and Dog
PC Pippin - A policeman who replaced Mr. Goon
Mr. Goon - The local policeman
Boysie Summers - The pantomime cat in the Dick Whittington skit
Zoe Markham - Dick Whittington in the Dick Whittington skit
Alec Grant - Dick's mother in the Dick's Whittington skit
John James - The king in the Dick Whittington skit
William Orr - The captain of Dick's ship in the Dick Whittington skit
Peter Watting - Dick's master in the Dick Whittington skit
Lucy White - Margot, who is Dick Whittington's sweetheart in the Dick Whittington skit
Theatre Manager - The manager of the theatre where the skit is played

External links
Enid Blyton Society page

Novels by Enid Blyton
1949 British novels
Methuen Publishing books
1949 children's books